Syria competed at the 2013 Mediterranean Games in Mersin, Turkey from the 20–30 June 2013.

Medal table

|  style="text-align:left; width:78%; vertical-align:top;"|

|  style="text-align:left; width:22%; vertical-align:top;"|

References

Nations at the 2013 Mediterranean Games
2013
Mediterranean Games